Shirju Posht-e Bala (also Romanized as Shīrjū Posht-e Bālā; also known as Shīrjū Posht and Shīrjū Posht-e Bālā Maḩalleh) is a village in Shirju Posht Rural District, Rudboneh District, Lahijan County, Gilan Province, Iran. At the 2006 census, its population was 594, in 164 families.

References 

Populated places in Lahijan County